Tetrick is a surname. Notable people with the surname include:

Alison Tetrick (born 1985), American racing cyclist
Harry W. Tetrick (1911–1977), American sound engineer
Jennifer Tetrick (born 1981), American racing cyclist
Josh Tetrick (born 1980), American entrepreneur
Tim Tetrick (born 1982), American harness racer